Əzizbəyov (also, Azizbekov and Azizbekovo) is a village and municipality in the Goranboy Rayon of Azerbaijan.  It has a population of 710.

References 

Populated places in Goranboy District